Kelly Boone Vint-Castro (born March 19, 1982) is an American actress, commercial print model, and  personal relationship coach. The daughter of actors Alan Vint and Susan Mullen, she began working as an actress at an early age and was a SAG member by time she was four years old,  although, Vint-Castro's first formal acting job was at nine months old in a commercial.

Acting career

Stargate

Vint-Castro's first major acting role in a film was in Stargate at eleven years old, playing the role of young Catherine Langford in the opening of the feature film in 1994, in which Catherine visits the Giza Plateau with her father in 1928.

Stargate Origins
Vint-Castro and Stargate Origins director, Mercedes Bryce Morgan, met while they were both working on another project in 2017. After the new Stargate series was announced at San Diego Comic-Con in July, 2017, Mercedes asked Vint-Castro to make a cameo appearance as an older Catherine Langford.  Vint-Castro plays a woman working at a secret warehouse facility where the Stargate is being kept during Stargate Origins.  She shares the screen with Origins leads, Ellie Gall and Connor Trinneer, where Vint-Castro plays an older Catherine.

Thunder Alley

Vint-Castro's next acting role was on ABC's sitcom, Thunder Alley, playing Claudine Turner, the precocious granddaughter of Gil Jones, played by Edward Asner. The sitcom aired for 2 seasons in 1994-1995.

Reversal
Vint-Castro, who is credited under the name Kelly Boone in the film Reversal, portrays the secret girlfriend of high school wrestler Leo Leone, played by Danny Mousetis. The 2001 independent family feature is directed by Alan Vint, (Vint-Castro's father) and written by actor Jimi Petulla, who based the script on his own experiences as a high school wrestler. Reversal is the only film that Vint-Castro and her father ever worked on together.

Commercial Print Acting and Modeling
Vint-Castro works in the commercial print industry as an actress and model. Her first commercial work began when she was nine months old and throughout her childhood she appeared in national commercials for businesses such as McDonald's. Since 2016, Vint-Castro has appeared in national television commercials and print advertising with her husband, Rudy Castro, and their three children.

Early life
Vint-Castro was born in Los Angeles, California into a family of actors.  Her father Alan Vint acted in such films as Panic in Needle Park and The Deadly Tower and in a variety of TV Series such as, Hawaii Five-0, Bonanza, and Baretta. Her mother Susan (Sue) Mullen was a successful commercial actress who took Vint-Castro on auditions, which landed her roles in advertising commercials and acting opportunities. Vint-Castro is the niece of actor Jesse Vint.

Conscious Partnership Coaching
In 2017, Vint-Castro and her husband, Rudy Castro, created "Conscious Partnership Coaching," in Los Angeles, California. They work with couples on a variety of topics pertaining to healthy relationships, hosting events internationally. They write a regular monthly column titled, "Matters of the Heart," in the non-profit addiction recovery publication, Keys To Recovery.

Television

Film

References

External links
 

American actresses
1982 births
Living people
21st-century American women